Kranz Peak is a peak  high, standing  northwest of Mount Przywitowski, between the heads of Holdsworth Glacier and Bartlett Glacier, in the Queen Maud Mountains of Antarctica. It was named by the Advisory Committee on Antarctic Names for Commander Arthur C. Kranz, staff meteorological officer, U.S. Naval Support Force, Antarctica, during U.S. Navy Operation Deep Freeze 1966 and 1967.

References

Mountains of the Ross Dependency
Amundsen Coast